The Lethbridge Hurricanes are a Canadian major junior ice hockey team currently members of the Eastern Conference (Central Division) of the Western Hockey League (WHL). The team is based in Lethbridge, Alberta, and play their home games at the ENMAX Centre.

History
When the Lethbridge Broncos returned to their original home in Swift Current following the 1985–86 season, hockey fans in Lethbridge did not have to wait long for a new team; after just one year out of the WHL, Lethbridge returned to the WHL in 1987–88 when the Calgary Wranglers moved south to become the Hurricanes.

The team's crowning achievement came in 1996–97, when the Hurricanes captured their first, and to date only, WHL Championship.  The Hurricanes then finished as Memorial Cup runners-up when they lost the title game to the Hull Olympiques. That same year, they also won their division title (only done twice before, in 1989–90 and 1990–91) and the regular season title. In the 2007–08 season, the Hurricanes won the Eastern Conference Championship.

The team changed its logo for the 2013–14 season per requests from the National Hockey League's Washington Capitals, who claim the former Hurricanes’ logo was too similar to theirs. Despite the optimism going into the season under new head coach Drake Berehowsky, who replaced the fired Rich Preston, the 2013–14 season would be a record-setting one, but in the wrong categories; the team stumbled out of the gate and dealt with turmoil amongst the players and coaching staff. Some notable occurrences saw veteran forwards Sam McKechnie and Jaimen Yakuboski sent home until both players were dealt to the Seattle Thunderbirds in October. A week later, third year defenseman Ryan Pilon requested a trade and left the team. Pilon got his wish and was dealt to the Brandon Wheat Kings in a multiplayer deal shortly afterwards. In addition to two more players requesting trades, the team endured a public relations nightmare when Assistant Coach Brad Lukowich walked out on the team following a 3–2 victory over the Prince Albert Raiders. Lukowich was terminated "with cause" days later. The team hit new lows by scoring a franchise-low 171 goals, allowing 358 goals and earned notoriety by losing two games by a combined score of 22–0; the first humiliation was a 10–0 loss to the Vancouver Giants on January 24, 2014, followed by a 12–0 loss to the Edmonton Oil Kings on February 17. The team capped off the season on a 15-game losing streak, finishing the year at 12–55–2–3 with 29 points, the League's lowest point total, placing them in last place in the entire WHL. The 12 wins and 29 points also set records for fewest wins and fewest points in the 26-year history of the Lethbridge Hurricanes, and the 46-year history of the franchise that began as the Winnipeg Jets.

In 2014, the community-owned franchise faced serious financial problems, which came to light. The team lost upwards of $1.25 million in a two-year period and went as far as scaling back on their marketing campaigns and player accommodations on road trips. In March 2014, the team revealed it took out a line of credit in order to meet financial goals. The financial situation of the team led to internet rumours of the team being sold to True North Sports and Entertainment and relocated to Winnipeg, while former Hurricanes forward and Lethbridge native Kris Versteeg has publicly stated his desire to purchase the team and keep it in the city.  As the losses continued to pile up and the fan interest waned, the team fired head coach Drake Berehowsky on December 9 and general manager Brad Robson on December 10, and hired former Prince Albert Raiders head coach Peter Anholt to both positions that day.

Anholt stepped down as coach, but stayed on as general manager, and hired 33-year-old Brent Kisio away from the Calgary Hitmen as the team's new head coach.

Under Kisio, the team's on-ice performance improved considerably as it returned to contender status.

Season-by-season record
Note: GP = Games played, W = Wins, L = Losses, T = Ties, OTL = Overtime losses, GF = Goals for, GA = Goals against

WHL Championship history
1989–90: Loss, 1-4 vs Kamloops
1990–91: Loss, 0-4 vs Spokane
1996–97: Win, 4-0 vs Seattle
2007–08: Loss, 0-4 vs Spokane

Current roster
Updated January 11, 2023.

Team records

NHL alumni

See also
 List of ice hockey teams in Alberta

References

 Western Hockey League website
 2005–06 WHL Guide

External links
 Lethbridge Hurricanes site

Ice hockey teams in Alberta
Sport in Lethbridge
Ice hockey clubs established in 1987
Western Hockey League teams
1987 establishments in Alberta